Hazor or Hatzor may refer to:

Places
 Hatzor, a kibbutz in Be'er Tuvia Regional Council, Southern District, Israel
 Hatzor Airbase, an Israeli Air Force military air base
 Hazor HaGelilit, a town in northern Israel near Rosh Pinna and Safed
 Baal-hazor, the highest point on Mount Hazor, named in the Second Book of Samuel
 En-hazor, a fortified settlement named in the Book of Joshua
 Mount Hazor, a plateau on the boundary between Samaria and Judea
 Nahal Hazor, a tributary to the Jordan River in the Dead Sea watershed
 Tel Hazor, an archaeological tell at the site of ancient Hazor in the southern Hula Valley
 Kingdoms of Hazor, mentioned in Jeremiah 49:28 and 49:30

Other
 "Hazor", a song on the 1998 album The Circle Maker (among several others) by John Zorn
 Hatzor Junction, the intersection of Highway 40 (Israel) and Route 3922 in Bnei Ayish